Mioawateria hondelattensis is an extinct species of sea snail, a marine gastropod mollusk in the family Raphitomidae.

Description

Distribution
Fossils of this marine species were found in Oligocene strata in the Landes, Aquitaine, France

References

 Lozouet P. (2017). Les Conoidea de l'Oligocène supérieur (Chattien) du bassin de l'Adour (Sud-Ouest de la France). Cossmanniana. 19: 3–180.

External links
 MNHN, Paris: holotype

hondelattensis
Gastropods described in 2017